The 1987 Railway Cup Hurling Championship was the 61st staging of the Railway Cup since its establishment by the Gaelic Athletic Association in 1927. The cup began on 3 October 1987 and ended on 4 October 1987.

Connacht were the defending champions.

On 4 October 1987, Connacht won the cup after a 2-14 to 1-14 defeat of Leinster in the final at Cusack Park. This was their sixth Railway Cup title overall and their second title in succession.

Results

Semi-finals

Shield final

Final

Bibliography

 Donegan, Des, The Complete Handbook of Gaelic Games (DBA Publications Limited, 2005).

References

Railway Cup Hurling Championship
Railway Cup Hurling Championship
Hurling